Vicky Xiuzhong Xu (born 1994) is an Australian policy analyst and journalist known for exposing human rights abuses in China. In March 2020, Xu was the lead author of a report, Uyghurs for Sale, stating many Uyghurs from Xinjiang had been moved to China proper for forced labour.  This led to a campaign of harassment against Xu, including death threats and smear videos.

Early life 
Xu was born in Jiayuguan City, Gansu Province, China. Her father is a member of the Chinese Communist Party (CCP).

Education in China 
Xu's high school is No. 3 Middle School of Jiuquan Iron and Steel Company(嘉峪关市酒钢三中). In 2012, Xu entered the Communication University of China in Beijing. In a gap year in 2014, Xu travelled to Perth, teaching Mandarin at a suburban high school. At this point she was a CCP supporter. However, she began to change after watching a documentary about the 1989 Tiananmen Square protests and massacre.

Study in Melbourne and Jerusalem 
Abandoning her studies in Beijing, Xu became an undergraduate in Political Science at the University of Melbourne with an exchange semester at Harry S. Truman Research Institute. At this time, Xu was openly supportive of the CCP. However, after interviewing a Chinese dissident, Wu Lebao, for an assignment, Xu began to review her previous positions.

Career 

After leaving China, Xu has worked as a journalist for Australian and US media, and performed stand-up comedy. More recently, she has served as a policy analyst with the Australian Strategic Policy Institute.

Journalist, comedian, analyst 
During her studies, Xu wrote as a freelancer for The New York Times in Beijing  and Sydney.

After her graduation in 2018, Xu worked for the Australian Broadcasting Corporation (ABC), The New York Times and the Australian Strategic Policy Institute. Xu's reports have covered such topics as Australia–China relations, human rights abuses in China, and Australia's diaspora communities. At this time, Xu also worked as a stand-up comedian, using black humour to share her observations on China.

On a TV panel discussion in February 2020, Xu debated Wang Xining, the deputy head of China’s embassy in Australia over China's treatment of Uyghurs. In March, as the lead author on the report Uyghurs for Sale, Xu documented evidence showing that Chinese authorities were displacing Uyghur people from Xinjiang to other regions in China, then using them as forced labor, often to manufacture goods for global brands such as Adidas, Apple, BMW and Nike. The report became a basis for statements by US government agencies, along with European and Canadian universities, against Chinese mistreatment of ethnic and religious minorities. Xu has criticised the Australian government for not recognizing the Uyghur human rights crisis as genocide. She has also been critical of some China hawks, such as Sharri Markson for basing their views of China and the origins of the COVID-19 pandemic on conspiracy theories.

Targeting and harassment 
By 2019, Xu and her family were being actively harassed, with calls for her father, from whom she is now estranged, to be "punished" with exile on account of his daughter's views. When visiting her dying grandmother, she was warned not to return to China. In 2021, a four-part exposee about her private life was created.

In April, during a nation-wide smear campaign, the Chinese state media called her a traitor, a pawn controlled by the West, or a “female demon.” Queries for her name turn up thousands of results, including videos claiming to reveal details of her dating life, calling her “promiscuous” and “drug infested.” Internet users in China made death threats and called for her family to be tracked down. On an Australian news panel, Xu disclosed that harassment has extended beyond her, that: "people close to me who still live in China have been targeted by Chinese intelligence operatives. People close to me have been interrogated repeatedly and detained. They're paying a price for me to tell the truth here."

In January 2021, Allen & Unwin announced plans to publish Xu's upcoming memoir, You're So Brave.

References

1994 births
Living people
Chinese comedians
Chinese women comedians
People from Jiayuguan
Communication University of China alumni
University of Melbourne alumni
Australian columnists
Australian women columnists
Chinese columnists
Chinese women columnists
Australian stand-up comedians
Australian women comedians
Chinese dissidents